

Qualification system
A total of 250 sport shooters will qualify to compete at the games. The winner of each event at the 2014 South American Games and 2014 Central American and Caribbean Games will qualify for the Games. The remaining qualifying spots will be decided at the 2014 Pan American Shooting Championship. The host nation is guaranteed 15 athletes (one per event) and a further five wildcards will be awarded. A nation may enter a maximum of 25 athletes across all events.

An athlete may only claim one quota spot for their country. For the two regional games quotas will be awarded in the order the events are held. For the Continental Championship: rifle quotas for men will be awarded in the following order: prone, air rifle and three position. Women’s rifle quotas will be awarded in air rifle, followed by three positions. Pistol quotas will be awarded in the event sequence: 25 meter, 50 meter and 10 meter for men and 10m followed by 25m for women. There was no award schedule for the shotgun events at the event.

A nation may transfer a pistol quota earned in one event to another event within the discipline only. An athlete may enter more than one event, granted no more than two athletes per country contest the event.

Qualification timeline

Qualification summary
The final quota allocation table as of April 9, 2015:

Men

50 m rifle three positions

50 m rifle prone

10 m air rifle

50 m pistol

25 m rapid fire pistol

10 m air pistol

Trap

No eligible athlete was eligible for a quota at the Central American Games and Caribbean Games, and thus this spot will be awarded as a wildcard.

Double trap

Skeet

No eligible athlete was eligible for a quota at the Central American Games and Caribbean Games, and thus this spot will be awarded as a wildcard.

Women

50 m rifle three positions

10 m air rifle

25 m pistol

10 m air pistol

Trap

The women's trap event was not held at the South American Games, and an additional quota was awarded at the Pan American Championships.

Skeet

The women's skeet event was not held at the Central American and Caribbean Games, and an additional quota was awarded at the Pan American Championships.

References

Pan American Games
Qualification for the 2015 Pan American Games
Shooting at the 2015 Pan American Games